Kurovsky or Kurovskoy (both masculine), Kurovskaya (feminine), or Kurovskoye (neuter) is the name of several inhabited localities in Russia.

Urban localities
Kurovskoye, Moscow Oblast, a town in Orekhovo-Zuyevsky District of Moscow Oblast
Kurovskoy, a settlement in Dzerzhinsky District of Kaluga Oblast

Rural localities
Kurovsky (rural locality), a settlement in Berezovsky Rural Okrug of Kireyevsky District of Tula Oblast
Kurovskoye, Dzerzhinsky District, Kaluga Oblast, a village in Dzerzhinsky District, Kaluga Oblast
Kurovskoye, Kozelsky District, Kaluga Oblast, a village in Kozelsky District, Kaluga Oblast
Kurovskoye, Sverdlovsk Oblast, a selo in Kamyshlovsky District of Sverdlovsk Oblast
Kurovskoye, Vologda Oblast, a village in Kubensky Selsoviet of Vologodsky District of Vologda Oblast